The Vancouver School of Arts and Academics (VSAA) is a public arts magnet school for grades 6 to 12 in Vancouver, Washington, United States. It is part of the Vancouver Public Schools and in addition to traditional academic studies, the school's curriculum has an in-depth elective study of the performing, literary, musicall, theatrical and visual arts, as well as film studies (called "moving image arts" at the school).

History 
The VSAA was established in 1996. The building originally housed Shumway Junior High School. Leslie Durst has been a substantial donor to VSAA since its beginning, aiding in the well being of the arts and the school. A notable piece of the building, the Royal Durst Theatre was funded by Leslie and named after her father. Recently, she even funded the replacement of the seats in the Royal Durst theatre. Leslie continues to be a part in helping art students succeed by giving out the Leslie B. Durst scholarship to VSAA students that will continue to pursue the arts in college.

References

External links 
 

Art schools in Washington (state)
Public middle schools in Washington (state)
Magnet schools in Washington (state)
High schools in Vancouver, Washington
Public high schools in Washington (state)
Educational institutions established in 1996
1996 establishments in Washington (state)